This article includes current squads of Hungary U-20 and U-19 national football teams.

The road to 2008 UEFA Euro U-19 

After 11 years, the Hungarian U-19 football team qualified to the EURO U-19 final tournament. At the first round of qualifiers the team finished the top of the group, with 3 victories, against Kazakhstan (6-0), Wales (3-1), and Switzerland (2-1). After that, second round was much harder, but as a host of the Group 2 matches, the team played at home, in Hungary, and the atmosphere helped in times of need. The first match against Lithuania, was a 2-2 draw, but in the last 2 matches, the team could win, against Cyprus 2-1, and Portugal 1-0 and that was enough to qualify.

Results and fixtures

2022 UEFA European Under-19 Championship

Qualifiers

Elite Round – Group 1

Current squad 
 The following players were called up for the friendly matches.
 Match dates: 16 and 19 November 2022
 Opposition: Caps and goals correct as of:''' 27 September 2022, after the match against

See also
 Hungary national football team
 Hungary national under-21 football team
 Hungary national under-17 football team

References

External links
Hungarian Football Federation
uefa.com European U-19 Championship

Under-19
European national under-19 association football teams